Qeshlaq-e Ayiri Darreh may refer to:
 Qeshlaq-e Ayiri Darreh Hajj Chapar
 Qeshlaq-e Ayiri Darreh Hajj Mahbat